Swami Vivekananda: Messiah of Resurgent India (2003) is a book written by Pranaba Ranjan Bhuyan. This book is a comprehensive biography of Swami Vivekananda. The book was published by Atlantic Publishers & Dist, New Delhi.

Content 
The book has been divided into eight chapters (excluding Forward, Preface, Bibliography and Index). Each chapter also has multiple sub-chapters. In the book Bhuyan has given a detailed biography of Vivekananda, as well as he has added comments, notes too. He also discussed on basis, nature or features of Vivekananda's nationalism or Swami Vivekananda's nationalism and imperialism.

See also 
 Life And Philosophy Of Swami Vivekananda

References

External links 
 

2003 non-fiction books
Indian biographies
Books of Hindu biography
Books about Swami Vivekananda
21st-century Indian books